Watford City (Hidatsa: abaʔaruʔush), founded in 1914, is a city in and the county seat of McKenzie County, North Dakota, United States. The population was 6,207 at the 2020 census, making it the thirteenth largest city in North Dakota. Because Watford City is part of the Bakken field, the North Dakota oil boom has significantly increased population and construction since the 2010 census.

The main offices of Frontier Energy Group, First International Bank, and the headquarters of McKenzie Electric Cooperative are in Watford City. The local newspaper is the McKenzie County Farmer.

History
In 1913, a few prospective businessmen located on the townsite of the future Watford City in anticipation of the arrival of the first Great Northern Railroad train. The Northern Land and Townsite Company, a division of the Great Northern, platted the town and sold lots in June 1914. Building began immediately, and many businesses and homes were moved from Schafer, which eventually became a ghost town. Watford was incorporated in June 1915, and was named by Vaughan G. Morris (1879–1940) for his hometown of Watford, Ontario. A year later the town added "City" to its name to differentiate itself from Wolford in Pierce County.

The Great Northern planned to extend its line to New Rockford and in 1914 began building the "Madson Grade," one of the longest dirt filled railroad grades in the country about a mile west of town.  Two years later the grade was ninety feet high and nearly a mile long, but the project was abandoned shortly before the United States entered World War I.

Village officers were elected in 1915, and they concerned themselves with such tasks as impounding stray horses and cattle, prohibiting swine and chickens from town, locating hitching posts, and removing hay stacks from Main Street. The town had a band and baseball team from its founding.  A school and several churches were also constructed almost immediately.  During the Great Depression, a water and sanitary system was completed using labor mostly paid by the Public Works Administration.

In 1940, Watford City won a hotly contested campaign for county seat, defeating Alexander and Arnegard and taking the prize from Schafer. At first there was difficulty finding suitable office space, and a recently constructed hospital was sold to the county for use as a courthouse.  A new hospital was dedicated in 1952.  Watford City Air Force Station (formally Alexander) was opened nearby in 1979.

Geography
Watford City is located at  (47.802603, −103.280505).

Demographics

2010 census
At the census of 2010, there were 1,744 people, 733 households, and 445 families living in the city. The racial makeup of the city was 93.6% White, 0.1% African American, 3.4% Native American, 0.7% Asian, 0.1% Pacific Islander, 0.3% from other races, and 1.6% from two or more races. Hispanic or Latino of any race were 1.9%.

Of the 733 households 30.8% had children under the age of 18 living with them, 47.7% were married couples living together, 7.1% had a female householder with no husband present, 5.9% had a male householder with no wife present, and 39.3% were non-families. 34.7% of households were one person and 15.7% were one person aged 65 or older. The average household size was 2.30 and the average family size was 2.94.

The median age was 40.2 years. 24.8% of residents were under the age of 18; 6.9% were between the ages of 18 and 24; 23.6% were from 25 to 44; 26.8% were from 45 to 64; and 17.8% were 65 or older. The gender makeup of the city was 51.1% male and 48.9% female.

2000 census
At the census of 2000, there were 1,435 people, 619 households, and 378 families living in the city. The population density was 964.8 people per square mile (371.9/km). There were 790 housing units at an average density of 531.2 per square mile (204.7/km). The racial makeup of the city was 94.91% White, 0.21% African American, 3.83% Native American, 0.07% Asian, and 0.98% from two or more races. Hispanic or Latino of any race were 1.11% of the population.

Of the 619 households 28.4% had children under the age of 18 living with them, 48.9% were married couples living together, 8.7% had a female householder with no husband present, and 38.8% were non-families. 37.5% of households were one person and 22.0% were one person aged 65 or older. The average household size was 2.22 and the average family size was 2.91.

The age distribution was 24.8% under the age of 18, 5.7% from 18 to 24, 20.4% from 25 to 44, 24.8% from 45 to 64, and 24.3% 65 or older. The median age was 44 years. For every 100 females, there were 88.8 males. For every 100 females age 18 and over, there were 83.8 males.

The median household income was $29,688 and the median family income  was $36,850. Males had a median income of $32,250 versus $21,193 for females. The per capita income for the city was $18,084. About 9.8% of families and 12.2% of the population were below the poverty line, including 15.0% of those under age 18 and 13.9% of those age 65 or over.

Education
 Watford City Elementary School
 Watford City High School

Sites of interest
 Theodore Roosevelt National Park (North Unit)
 Maah Daah Hey Trail
 McKenzie County Heritage Park
 Long X Trading Post Visitor Center
 Pioneer Museum of McKenzie County

Climate
This climatic region is typified by large seasonal temperature differences, with warm to hot (and often humid) summers and cold (sometimes severely cold) winters.  According to the Köppen Climate Classification system, Watford City has a humid continental climate, abbreviated "Dfb" on climate maps. The wettest time of year is late spring to early summer; winter is the driest season. Temperature variation between seasons is significant.

References

External links

 Watford City Website
 Watford City golden jubilee, Watford City, North Dakota: 50 years of progress (1964) from the Digital Horizons website

Cities in McKenzie County, North Dakota
County seats in North Dakota
Populated places established in 1914
1914 establishments in North Dakota
Cities in North Dakota